Kar Kandeh (also Romanized as Kār Kandeh) is a village in Mazkureh Rural District, in the Central District of Sari County, Mazandaran Province, Iran. At the 2006 census, its population was 313, in 76 families.

References 

Populated places in Sari County